Samikannu Vincent (18 April 1883 – 22 April 1942) was a cinema exhibitor turned theatre owner. His first theatre was Variety Hall (now Delite theatre) in Coimbatore in 1914. He was a pioneer in making movies, popular in Madras presidency and contributing to growth of it by buying new equipment from abroad, as well as establishing the concept of modern day theatres that exist today.

Early days
Samikannu Vincent was born on 18 April 1883. He was born in Coimbatore. He was working in South Indian Railway as a draftsman-clerk. He happened to see some short films exhibited by French film exhibitor named DuPont. Vincent befriended him and by the time when DuPont wanted to return home, Samikannu Vincent raised enough money with difficulty to buy the Frenchman's projector, accessories and films. At the age of 22, he resigned his desk job and set up business as film exhibitor. He travelled to villages to exhibit the films he had. The film "Life of Jesus" became a huge hit in the "tent cinema" where he projected his films. Vincent usually screened his films in a tent, which was erected on a stretch of open land close to a town or village. The “tent cinema” concept became very popular.

Family
Samikannu Vincent had 4 wives with whom he had four sons and two daughters. As per his family members, Vincent married 4 wives as each one died in quick succession due to illness. He was a lovable father among all his children.
He never took his children along for long trips. One of his sons, Selvaraj, who studied both at St. Michaels in coimbatore and St. Joseph's College in Tiruchi, stopped with intermediate (Class XII now), because Vincent wanted him to look after his business. According to his family, his father was a good magician, for which he was dubbed evil, and refused communion by the church. “So, he had to perform in front of the church members, to prove that those were only tricks that came from his robe with innumerable pockets”

Development

During 1905, electric carbons were used in motion picture projector. During the same year Samikannu Vincent established his first tent cinema at Madras called Edison's Grand Cinemamegaphone on Esplanade. At that time it was a novelty to watch films in this tent theatre. The electrically lit tent drew large crowds. He travelled with his tent cinema to different parts of the world like Malaysia and Singapore. Aware of the advantages of brick and mortar cinema house, he built one in his home town in 1914 called Variety Hall.

Association with cinema
In 1933, Pioneer film company Calcutta and Samikannu Vincent co-produced "Valli". Since there was also a similar production was in progress in Bombay, the Calcutta version was named as Valli Thirumanam. It had T.P. Rajalakshmi playing the lead role and went on to become a huge hit. He also later co-produced "Sampoorna Harichandra" and "Subhadra Parinayam". When the historic Central Studios was inaugurated in 1935, Samikannu Vincent joined the team as one of the directors. Besides production he was also involved in equipment distribution and theatre management. He was also known for first introducing talkie equipment for his theatre in Coimbatore beating madras

Other notable works
In 1916, realising the need for a printing press to produce quality handbills and other materials, he promoted the printing press that was located in a house near his theatre. He expanded the activities of the press by installing additional machinery, types and printing accessories in another building. Called Electric Printing Works, he used the cinema house's electric power plant to run the printing press too and created history of sorts.

By 1919, he had established the first power-driven rice and flour mill in the heart of the town. He managed all this by working as long as nine hours a day, until his sons took over. In 1922, the then government of Madras gave him permission to supply electric power to the famous Stanes European High School. With the encouragement of Sir C.P. Ramaswamy Aiyer, member of the Governor's Executive Council in charge of the Electricity portfolio, he was given enough support by the government. His application was approved and the licence to set up a power house was granted. The streets of Coimbatore and the residential buildings in the heart of the city had electric lights.

Death
Samikannu Vincent died on 22 April 1942.

Association with J. P. Chandrababu
Comedian J. P. Chandrababu married the granddaughter of Samikannu Vincent, and later divorced.

Legacy
His birthday is celebrated as Cinema theatre day.

A Tamil documentary on Vincent's life, Pezhamozi (Silent Language), was also released.

References

1883 births
1942 deaths
Sri Lankan film people